Elisabeth Sonrel (1874 Tours – 1953 Sceaux) was a French painter and illustrator in the Art Nouveau style. Her works included allegorical subjects, mysticism, symbolism, portraits, and landscapes.

She was the daughter of Nicolas Stéphane Sonrel, a painter from Tours, and received her early training from him. For further study she went on to Paris as a student of Jules Lefebvre at the Ecole des Beaux-Arts.

In 1892 she painted her diploma work, 'Pax et Labor', a work to be seen at the Musée des Beaux-Arts de Tours. From then on she exhibited at the Salon des Artistes Français between 1893 and 1941, her signature pieces being large watercolors in a Pre-Raphaelite manner, which she adopted after a trip to Florence and Rome, discovering the Renaissance painters - some of her work having clear overtones of Botticelli. Her paintings were often inspired by Arthurian romance, Dante Alighieri's 'Divine Comedy' and 'La Vita Nuova', biblical themes, and medieval legends. Her mystical works include 'Ames errantes' (Salon of 1894) and 'Les Esprits de l’abime' (Salon of 1899) and 'Jeune femme a la tapisserie'.

At the Exposition Universelle of 1900, the primary theme of which was Art Nouveau, her 1895 painting 'Le Sommeil de la Vierge' (Sleep of the Virgin), was awarded a bronze medal, and the Henri Lehmann prize of 3000 francs by L'académie des Beaux-Arts. From 1900 onwards she confined her painting to portraits, scenic Brittany landscapes, and the occasional flower study. She made regular painting trips to Brittany, inspired by the forest of Brocéliande, and from 1910 to various places on the coast such as Concarneau, Plougastel, Pont-l'Abbé and Loctudy, often staying at inns and accompanied by one or two students. She painted several works in Le Faouët before constructing a villa in La Baule in the 1930s. Working mainly in watercolour and gouache, she discovered a ready supply of models among young girls in the area, and found Bretons generally to be friendly, honest and self-confident.

Her final exhibit at the Salon was in 1941 at the age of 67. There is also a record of her having exhibited at Liverpool. In her early years Sonrel produced posters, postcards and illustrations, in Art Nouveau style.

References

External links

Elisabeth Sonrel gallery
Elisabeth Sonrel gallery2
Pre-Raphaelite gallery

1874 births
1953 deaths
19th-century French painters
20th-century French painters
French women painters
French illustrators
French women illustrators
Pre-Raphaelite painters
Art Nouveau painters
Art Nouveau illustrators
Artists from Tours, France
20th-century French women
Pre-Raphaelite illustrators
Female Pre-Raphaelite painters